The Malmö Games is an annual track and field competition. The inaugural indoor edition was held in 2015 and took place at the Malmö Arena in Malmö, Sweden. For the 2017 edition the meeting takes place outdoor and is to be held at the Malmö Stadion.

Indoor Meeting records

Men

Women

References

External links
Official website

Annual indoor track and field meetings
Recurring sporting events established in 2015
2015 establishments in Sweden
Sport in Malmö
Athletics competitions in Sweden